A vaccine is a biological preparation that provides immunity to an infectious disease.

Vaccine or The Vaccine(s) may also refer to:

 Vaccine (journal), a medical journal
 Vaccine: The Controversial Story of Medicine's Greatest Lifesaver, a 2007 book by Arthur Allen
 Vaccine (instrument), a Haitian musical instrument
 Vaccine (musician), Christine Clements, American dubstep record producer
 "Vaccine", a song by Mew from No More Stories..., 2009
 "The Vaccine" (The Outer Limits), a television episode
 The Vaccines, an English rock band

See also
 Vaccination, the process of administering a vaccine
 Vaccine hesitancy, a reluctance or refusal to be vaccinated or to have one's children vaccinated